LPX (short for Low Profile eXtension), originally developed by Western Digital, was a loosely defined motherboard format (form factor) widely used in the 1990s.

There was never any official LPX specification, but the design normally featured a  motherboard with the main I/O ports mounted on the back (something that was later adopted by the ATX form factor), and a riser card in the center of the motherboard, on which the PCI and ISA slots were mounted. Due to the lack of standardized specification, riser cards were seldom compatible from one motherboard design to another, much less one manufacturer to another. The internal PSU connector was of the same type used in the AT form factor. 

One of the more successful features to come out of the LPX specification was its use of more compact power supplies, which later became widely used on Baby AT and even full size AT cases.  Because LPX form factor power supplies became ubiquitous in most computer cases prior to the ATX standard, it was not unusual for manufacturers to refer to them as "AT" power supplies (or occasionally as "PS/2" power supplies due to its use by the IBM PS/2), even though the actual AT and Baby AT power supply form factors were larger in size.  The LPX form factor power supply eventually formed the basis for the ATX form factor power supply, which is the same width and height.

The specification was very popular in the early-mid 1990s, and briefly displaced the AT form factor as the most commonly used. However, the release of the Pentium II in 1997 highlighted the flaws of the format, as a good airflow was important in Pentium II systems, owing to the relatively high heat dispersal requirements of the processor. LPX systems suffered a restricted airflow due to the centrally placed riser cards. The introduction of the AGP format further complicated matters, as the design not only increased the pin count on riser cards, but it limited most cards to one AGP, one PCI and one ISA slot, which was too restrictive for most users. Some lower-quality LPX boards didn't even feature a real AGP slot, but simply used a physical AGP slot and connected it to the PCI bus. This was seldom noticed however, as many "AGP" graphics cards of the time were in fact PCI cards internally, and did not take advantage of the features offered by AGP.

LPX was phased out around 1998. NLX was the intended successor, though many manufacturers chose MicroATX or proprietary motherboard formats instead.

References

External links
 LPX form factor at the PC Guide

IBM PC compatibles
Motherboard form factors